St Kentigern's Church may refer to:

Churches in Scotland
St Kentigern's Church, Lanark (Hyndford Road), ruined church in Lanark
St Kentigern's Church, Lanark (Hope Street), newer church in Lanark, distinct from St Kentigern's Church, Lanark (Hyndford Road)
St Kentigern's Church, Ballater, Aberdeenshire
St Kentigern's Church, Edinburgh (Union Canal)

Churches in England
St Kentigern's Church, Caldbeck,  Cumbria
St. Kentigern's Church, Aspatria,  Cumbria
St Kentigern's Church, Crosthwaite, Keswick, Cumbria
St Kentigern's Church, Mungrisdale, Mungrisdale, Cumbria
St Kentigern's Church, Castle Sowerby, Castle Sowerby, Cumbria
Church of Most Holy Redeemer and St Kentigern, Melling, Merseyside

See also
Glasgow Cathedral, also known as St Kentigern's